is a Japanese former professional boxer who competed from 1986 to 1999. He has held world championships in two weight classes, having held the WBC mini-flyweight title from 1987 to 1988, and the WBA light-flyweight title from 1991 to 1992. He was the first ever WBC mini flyweight champion, winning the title immediately after the mini-flyweight division was created.

Biography 
Ioka entered the Miwa Tsuda Gym (current Green Tsuda Gym) while attending middle school, and made his professional debut in 1986 at the age of 17. He won the Japanese mini-flyweight title in his eighth professional fight in 1987, and fought for the newly created WBC mini-flyweight title the same year, winning by unanimous decision to become the youngest Japanese boxer to win a world title, at 18 years and 9 months old. This record remains unbroken today.

Ioka made his first defense against IBF mini-flyweight champion Kyung-Yun Lee in January, 1988, winning by knockout in the 12th round. Ioka's trainer, Eddie Townsend, was in the hospital during the fight, and died shortly after hearing that Ioka had won. Ioka made his second defense in June, 1988, against Napa Kiatwanchai of Thailand, retaining his title by a 12-round draw. The fight was highly controversial, as Kiatwanchai's side claimed that the last round was ended almost 30 seconds early in order to make the fight a draw. Ioka had almost been knocked out by Kiatwanchai in the final round. Ioka was ordered to have a rematch with Kiatwanchai for his third defense in December, 1988, and lost his title by 12-round decision. Ioka fought Kiatwanchai again in June, 1989, for his former title, but lost again by TKO in the 11th round.

Ioka moved up to the light flyweight division, and challenged undefeated champion Myung-Woo Yuh, for the WBA light-flyweight title in December, 1991. Ioka won a close split-decision victory, and defended his title twice in 1992. He met Yuh again in his third defense of the title in November, 1992, but lost by decision, losing his title.

Ioka moved up to the flyweight division in 1993, aiming to win titles in three weight classes, but lost to David Griman in Round 8 of the WBA flyweight title match. He would challenge the WBA Flyweight title two more times, losing by TKO both times, and challenged WBA super-flyweight champion Satoshi Iida in April, 1998, losing by 12-round decision. In December of that year, Ioka lost a 10-round non-title match to an unranked fighter, and decided to retire from boxing. The unranked fighter was Masamori Tokuyama, who would later defend the WBC super-flyweight title nine times. Ioka's career record was 33-8-1 (17KOs).

Post retirement 
He currently trains and manages young fighters at the Ioka Boxing Gym (Ioka Promotions), and appears on local television shows from time to time.

In 2000, Ioka fought a 14-year-old Koki Kameda in a two-round exhibition match, which was broadcast as part of a television documentary on the Kameda family. Kameda was training at the Green Tsuda Gym at the time, where Ioka trained for much of his career. Kameda scored a knockdown on the former two division title holder from a left straight and right hook combination, but the referee ruled it as a slip. The fight ended up as a two-round draw decision. Kameda would go on to controversially win one of Ioka's former titles; the WBA light-flyweight title.

His nephew, Kazuto Ioka, has won six amateur boxing titles, and is a four-weight world champion, having held the WBA and WBC mini-flyweight titles between 2011 and 2012, the WBA light-flyweight title between 2012 and 2014, and the WBA flyweight title between 2015 and 2017. He currently holds the WBO super-flyweight title.

Professional boxing record 

{|class="wikitable" style="text-align:center; font-size:95%"
|-
!
!Result
!Record
!Opponent
!Type
!Round, time
!Date
!Location
!Notes
|- align=center
|42
|Loss||33–8–1||align=left| Masamori Tokuyama
|TKO
|5 (10), 
|1998–12–19
|align=left|
|align=left|
|- align=center
|41
|Win||33–7–1||align=left| Jerry Pahayahay
|PTS
|10
|1998–09–03
|align=left|
|align=left|
|- align=center
|40
|Loss||32–7–1||align=left| Satoshi Iida
|MD
|12
|1998–04–29
|align=left|
|align=left|
|- align=center
|39
|Win||32–6–1||align=left| Hidekazu Sakata
|TKO
|9 (10), 
|1998–02–03
|align=left|
|align=left|
|- align=center
|38
|Win||31–6–1||align=left| Pinoy Montejo
|UD
|10
|1997–11–18
|align=left|
|align=left|
|- align=center
|37
|Loss||30–6–1||align=left| José Bonilla
|TKO
|7 (12), 
|1997–02–25
|align=left|
|align=left|
|- align=center
|36
|Win||30–5–1||align=left| Hiroki Shinozaki
|
|4 (10), 
|1996–10–18
|align=left|
|align=left|
|- align=center
|35
|Win||29–5–1||align=left| Ricky Sales
|PTS
|12
|1996–06–03
|align=left|
|align=left|
|- align=center
|34
|Win||28–5–1||align=left| Joel Nice
|KO
|2 (10), 
|1996–03–31
|align=left|
|align=left|
|- align=center
|33
|Loss||27–5–1||align=left| Saen Sor Ploenchit 
|TKO
|10 (12), 
|1995–10–17
|align=left|
|align=left|
|- align=center
|32
|Win||27–4–1||align=left| Kim Dong-Soo
|TKO
|4 (10), 
|1995–05–09
|align=left|
|align=left|
|- align=center
|31
|Win||26–4–1||align=left| Lee Escobido
|UD
|10
|1995–01–10
|align=left|
|align=left|
|- align=center
|30
|Win
|25–4–1
|align=left| Triffon Torralba
|KO
|4 (10), 
|1994–06–27
|align=left|
|align=left|
|- align=center
|29
|Win||24–4–1||align=left| David Franco
|KO
|5 (10), 
|1994–04–13
|align=left|
|align=left|
|- align=center
|28
|Win||23–4–1||align=left| John Medina
|TKO
|6 (10), 
|1993–11–08
|align=left|
|align=left|
|- align=center
|27
|Loss||22–4–1||align=left| David Griman
|TKO
|8 (12), 
|1993–06–21
|align=left|
|align=left|
|- align=center
|26
|Win||22–3–1||align=left| Ronnie Romero
|KO
|2 (10), 
|1993–01–29
|align=left|
|align=left|
|- align=center
|25
|Loss||21–3–1||align=left| Yuh Myung-Woo
|MD
|12
|1992–11–18
|align=left|
|align=left|
|- align=center
|24
|Win||21–2–1||align=left| Kim Bong-Jun
|UD
|12
|1992–06–15
|align=left|
|align=left|
|- align=center
|23
|Win||20–2–1||align=left| Noel Tunacao
|UD
|12
|1992–03–31
|align=left|
|align=left|
|- align=center
|22
|Win||19–2–1||align=left| Yuh Myung-Woo
|SD
|12
|1991–12–17
|align=left|
|align=left|
|- align=center
|21
|Win||18–2–1||align=left| Katsumi Komiyama
|KO
|5 (10), 
|1991–06–27
|align=left|
|align=left|
|- align=center
|20
|Win||17–2–1||align=left| Kenji Tezuka
|PTS
|10
|1991–04–05
|align=left|
|align=left|
|- align=center
|19
|Win||16–2–1||align=left| Max Forrosuelo
|UD
|10
|1991–01–17
|align=left|
|align=left|
|- align=center
|18
|Win||15–2–1||align=left| Jaime Aliguin
|PTS
|10
|1990–11–24
|align=left|
|align=left|
|- align=center
|17
|Win||14–2–1||align=left| Salagchit Sorchitphatana
|UD
|10
|1990–07–16
|align=left|
|align=left|
|- align=center
|16
|Win||13–2–1||align=left| John Ireng
|KO
|9 (10), 
|1990–04–09
|align=left|
|align=left|
|- align=center
|15
|Win||12–2–1||align=left| Udin Barahudin
|UD
|10
|1990–01–29
|align=left|
|align=left|
|- align=center
|14
|Loss||11–2–1||align=left| Napa Kiatwanchai
|TKO
|11 (12), 
|1989–06–10
|align=left|
|align=left|
|- align=center
|13
|Win||11–1–1||align=left| Hidekazu Kakehashi
|KO
|2 (10), 
|1989–02–08
|align=left|
|align=left|
|- align=center
|12
|Loss||10–1–1||align=left| Napa Kiatwanchai
|MD
|12
|1988–11–13
|align=left|
|align=left|
|- align=center
|11
|style="background:#abcdef;"|Draw||10–0–1||align=left| Napa Kiatwanchai
|PTS
|12
|1988–06–05
|align=left|
|align=left|
|- align=center
|qp
|Win||10–0||align=left| Kyung-Yung Lee
|TKO
|12 (12), 
|1988–01–31
|align=left|
|align=left|
|- align=center
|9
|Win||9–0||align=left| Mai Thomburifarm
|UD
|12
|1987–10–18
|align=left|
|align=left|
|- align=center
|8
|Win||8–0||align=left| Kenji Ono
|PTS
|10
|1987–07–08
|align=left|
|align=left|
|- align=center
|7
|Win||7–0||align=left| Akira Kiyono
|PTS
|8
|1987–04–28
|align=left|
|align=left|
|- align=center
|6
|Win||6–0||align=left| Hisashi Nakatomi
|TKO
|1 (6)
|1987–02–22
|align=left|
|align=left|
|- align=center
|5
|Win||5–0||align=left| Dash Higashiho
|TKO
|2 (4), 
|1986–10–07
|align=left|
|align=left|
|- align=center
|4
|Win||4–0||align=left| Masao Kasai
|PTS
|4
|1986–09–13
|align=left|
|align=left|
|- align=center
|3
|Win||3–0||align=left| Osamu Uemoto
|KO
|2 (4), 
|1986–03–05
|align=left|
|align=left|
|- align=center
|2
|Win||2–0||align=left| Hiroshi Udo
|KO
|2 (4), 
|1986–02–10
|align=left|
|align=left|
|- align=center
|1
|Win||1–0||align=left| Yukio Yorimochi
|KO
|3 (4), 
|1986–01–23
|align=left|
|align=left|

See also 
 List of WBA world champions
 List of WBC world champions
 List of Japanese boxing world champions
 Boxing in Japan

References

External links 
 
 Ioka boxing gym official (Japanese)
 Hiroki Ioka - CBZ Profile

|-

|-

1969 births
Living people
People from Sakai, Osaka
World Boxing Association champions
World Boxing Council champions
Mini-flyweight boxers
World mini-flyweight boxing champions
World light-flyweight boxing champions
Japanese male boxers